James Flynn (August 8, 1907 – August 15, 2000) was an American fencer. He won a bronze medal in the team sabre event at the 1948 Summer Olympics.

References

External links
 

1907 births
2000 deaths
American male sabre fencers
Fencers at the 1948 Summer Olympics
Olympic bronze medalists for the United States in fencing
Sportspeople from Paterson, New Jersey
Medalists at the 1948 Summer Olympics